Västra Skrävlinge is a former municipality in the Oxie district in the then Malmöhus County in Scania, southern Sweden. In 1911, it was incorporated into the city of Malmö and is today located in Malmö's eastern outskirts, including Rosengård. A church is located nearby.

Notable people 
 Fritz Landgren (1891–1977), footballer
 Prawitz Öberg (1930–1995), footballer

History of Skåne County